Ivan Bratko may refer to:

 Ivan Bratko (computer scientist) (born 1946), Slovene computer scientist and educator
 Ivan Bratko (publisher) (1914–2001), Slovene partisan, officer and writer